Westfield High School (Westfield, Massachusetts) is a public, coeducational high school located in Westfield, Massachusetts, United States founded in 1855. It serves as the public high school for students in grades 9 through 12, and has a student enrollment of 1,269 (2016–17).

Notable alumni

Lou Barlow, musician of the band Dinosaur Jr.
Alice Mary Dowd (1855–1943), educator, author
Walt Kowalczyk, former NFL player
Dan Trant, drafted by the Boston Celtics
Joel Stroetzel, musician of the band Killswitch Engage
John O'Connor, visual artist in the collection of the Museum of Modern Art and The Whitney Museum

References

External links
 WHS home page

Public high schools in Massachusetts
Educational institutions established in 1855
Schools in Hampden County, Massachusetts
1855 establishments in Massachusetts